Scroggins Aviation is an American aircraft salvage and aviation movie special effects company based in Las Vegas, Nevada. It has provided special effects for several network television shows and feature films.

History
The company initially operated in the commercial aircraft dismantling (aircraft boneyard), crash recovery (aeroplane accident recovery) and recycling industry, taking apart decommissioned aeroplanes and supplying aviation mock-up and props (using real retired aircraft) to the motion picture industry. The company changed its name in 2015 to Scroggins Aviation Mockup & Effects, and began to focus on the restoration and modification of airframes and cockpits for use in feature film and television productions. This has included both the interior and exterior of various aircraft and helicopters, fabricating both aeroplane parts and fuselage sections for filming.

Film and television
A selection of films that used Scroggins to produce aviation materials for its sets include Hobbs and Shaw",", Bumblebee (film)",",Deadpool 2",",Jurassic World,",Captain America: Civil War",", Terminator Genisys, Spider-Man: Homecoming, Dunkirk, Iron Man 3, Sully, Independence Day: Resurgence, Jumanji: Welcome to the Jungle, Fifty Shades Darker, and Flight. Television series for which Scroggins has designed sets have included The Event, Pan Am, Agents of S.H.I.E.L.D., The Night Shift, and The Last Ship''.

References

Aviation companies
Special effects companies
Companies based in Las Vegas
Jurassic Park